Tommaso Montano (born 14 March 1953) is an Italian fencer. He won a silver medal in the team sabre event at the 1976 Summer Olympics.

References

1953 births
Living people
Italian male fencers
Olympic fencers of Italy
Fencers at the 1976 Summer Olympics
Olympic silver medalists for Italy
Olympic medalists in fencing
Sportspeople from Livorno
Medalists at the 1976 Summer Olympics
20th-century Italian people